Cogent Partners is a boutique, private equity-focused investment bank and advisory firm and was one of the first advisory firms dedicated to transactions in the private equity secondary market (secondaries).  The firm, which was founded in 2002, provides an array of sell-side advisory services such as secondary advisory, portfolio valuation and other research functions.  Since inception, Cogent Partners has advised on over 5,639 limited partnership interests representing over $103 billion in private equity secondaries.

History 
The firm was founded by former investment professionals from the Crossroads Group.  Among its founders were Colin McGrady, Scott Myers, Stephen Sloan, Ian Charles, and Brian Mooney.  Crossroads was a private equity investment manager investing primarily as a fund of funds.  Within the secondary space, Crossroads was noted for its $340 million acquisition of a portfolio of direct investments in large- to mid-cap companies from Electronic Data Systems (EDS).  Since then, the firm has added a variety of professionals from various investment banking and management consulting backgrounds.

In April 2015, Greenhill & Co., Inc. (NYSE: GHL) finalized the acquisition of Cogent Partners which is now part of the Capital Advisory division of Greenhill and trades under the name of "Greenhill Cogent".

References

Pricing private equity secondary transactions, AltAssets, July 2002
US secondary specialist opens in London.  Financial News, April, 2004

External links
Greenhill Cogent

Former investment banks of the United States
Financial services companies established in 2002
Banks established in 2002
Private equity secondary market
Companies based in Dallas
2002 establishments in Texas